Inga silanchensis is a species of plant in the family Fabaceae. It is found only in Ecuador. Its natural habitats are subtropical or tropical moist lowland forests and subtropical or tropical moist montane forests.

References

silanchensis
Flora of Ecuador
Vulnerable plants
Taxonomy articles created by Polbot